Vivonne Bay Conservation Park, formerly the Vivonne Bay National Park, is a protected area in the Australian state of South Australia located on the south coast of Kangaroo Island in the gazetted locality of Vivonne Bay. It was dedicated in 1971 to conserve coastal country containing vegetation not already protected in Kelly Hill Conservation Park.

Description
The vegetation is mainly open scrub and open heath dominated by Eucalyptus diversifolia and E. rugosa, with low Calocephalus brownii shrubland on the coastal dunes and cliffs. The conservation park is classified as an IUCN Category Ia protected area.

See also
Vivonne (disambiguation)

References

External links
Vivonne Bay Conservation Park webpage on protected planet

Protected areas of Kangaroo Island
Conservation parks of South Australia
1971 establishments in Australia
Protected areas established in 1971